Dactylostomum is a genus of trematodes in the family Opecoelidae. It is synonyised with Opedunculata Dwivedi, 1975.

Species
Dactylostomum armatum (Dwivedi, 1975) Cribb, 2005
Dactylostomum caballeroi Martin, 1960
Dactylostomum cribbi Gibson, Bray & Langdon, 1990
Dactylostomum epinepheli Wang, 1982
Dactylostomum gracile Woolcock, 1935
Dactylostomum griffithsi Bray, 1987
Dactylostomum harishii Agrawal & Agarwal, 1988
Dactylostomum jhansiensis Agarwal & Agrawal, 1988
Dactylostomum kashiensis (Maurya, Agarwal & Singh, 1989) Cribb, 2005
Dactylostomum longivesiculum Shimazu & Machida, 1985
Dactylostomum manteri Ramadan, 1985
Dactylostomum nicolli Aken'Ova, Cribb & Bray, 2003
Dactylostomum sapani (Dwivedi & Dwivedi, 1982) Cribb, 2005
Dactylostomum satpali Agrawal & Sharma, 1989
Dactylostomum tanegashimense Shimazu & Machida, 1985
Dactylostomum vitellosum Manter, 1940
Dactylostomum woolcocki Ramadan, 1985
Dactylostomum yamagutii Ramadan, 1985

Species later synonymised with species of Dactylostomum
Dactylostomum armatum (Dwivedi, 1975) Cribb, 2005
Opedunculata armatus Dwivedi, 1975
Dactylostomum kashiensis (Maurya, Agarwal & Singh, 1989) Cribb, 2005
Opedunculata kashiensis Maurya, Agarwal & Singh, 1989
Dactylostomum sapani (Dwivedi & Dwivedi, 1982) Cribb, 2005
Opedunculata sapani Dwivedi & Dwivedi, 1982

References

Opecoelidae
Plagiorchiida genera